North-European ATM Industry Group (NATMIG), is a consortium member in the European public-private partnership that is managing the development phase of the Single European Sky ATM Research (SESAR) Programme .

Overview 
NATMIG aims at participation in the SESAR project thus developing the future airport systems according to the 
ATM Master Plan.

Legal basis 
A consortium agreement defines how these close competitors will work together.

Funding and Budget 
NATMIG is taking part in the 700M€ industrial share of the SJU PPP.

The project is valued at €36 million.

Members 
The members (equal shares) of the NATMIG Consortium are:
 Airtel ATN of Ireland (webpage)
 Saab AB of Sweden(webpage)
 SINTEF of Norway (webpage)
 originally Northrop Grumman Park Air Systems of Norway, now Indra Navia AS (webpage) - NGPAS was sold to Indra Sistemas SA in April 2012 and have changed name to Indra Navia AS

External links 
 NATMIG homepage
 SESAR JU web site
 SESAR
 Description of the SESAR Work Packages
 EUROCONTROL

References

Air traffic control in Europe
Air traffic control organizations
International aviation organizations